The Niuas by-election of 2005 was held on 5 May 2005 to elect a new People's Representative to the Tongan Legislative Assembly.  The vacancy occurred following the appointment of the incumbent, Sione Haukinima, to cabinet.  The by-election was won by Lepolo Taunisila, who became the first woman to sit in the Legislative Assembly in twenty years.

 
 
 
 
 
 

Results from Matangi Tonga.

References

2005 elections in Oceania
2005 in Tonga
Elections in Tonga
Niuas